Diatomocera is a genus of snout moths. It was described by Émile Louis Ragonot in 1893.

Species
 Diatomocera decurrens (Dyar, 1914)
 Diatomocera dosia (Dyar, 1914)
 Diatomocera hoplidice (Dyar, 1914)
 Diatomocera tenebricosa Zeller, 1881

References

Phycitinae
Taxa named by Émile Louis Ragonot
Pyralidae genera